Olga Konstantinovna Gorbunova (née Belova; born 27 August 1993) is a Russian water polo player. At the 2012 Summer Olympics, she competed for the Russia women's national water polo team in the women's event.

See also
 List of Olympic medalists in water polo (women)
 List of World Aquatics Championships medalists in water polo

References

External links
 

Russian female water polo players
1993 births
Living people
Olympic water polo players of Russia
Water polo players at the 2012 Summer Olympics
Water polo players at the 2016 Summer Olympics
Olympic bronze medalists for Russia
Olympic medalists in water polo
Medalists at the 2016 Summer Olympics
Universiade medalists in water polo
World Aquatics Championships medalists in water polo
Universiade bronze medalists for Russia
21st-century Russian women